Nanyang Sinchew may refer to:
 Nanyang Sinchew Lianhe Zaobao, Singapore morning newspaper
 Nanyang Sinchew Lianhe Wanbao, Singapore evening newspaper